Bina is an Iranian laser guided dual-capability surface-to-surface and air-to-surface missile.

History
It was successfully tested by Iranian military on February 10, 2014, according to Janes and Reuters. It appears to be an AGM-65 Maverick air-to-ground missile with a semi-active laser (SAL) seeker fitted to its nose.

Brigadier General Hossein Dehqan said the ballistic missile had radar-evading capabilities.  "The new generation of long-range ground-to-ground ballistic missile with a fragmentation warhead and the laser-guided air-to-surface and surface-to-surface missile dubbed Bina (Insightful) have been successfully test-fired. The Bina missile is capable of striking important targets such as bridges, tanks and enemy command centres with great precision."

References

Islamic Republic of Iran Army
Guided missiles of Iran
Surface-to-surface missiles of Iran
Air-to-surface missiles of Iran